The Shakti Bhatt Prize is a literary award established in 2007 in memory of Indian publisher, Shakti Bhatt. Between 2008 and 2019, it was awarded for first books published in India by an author of any age in the genres of poetry, fiction, creative non-fiction and drama. From 2020 onward, the Prize has been awarded in recognition of a writer's body of work, instead of a first book.

Establishment 
The Shakti Bhatt First Book Prize was established by an eponymous foundation in memory of Shakti Bhatt, an Indian publisher. Bhatt, the editor of Indian publishing house, Bracket Books, died following an illness in 2007. The Shakti Bhatt Foundation was established in her memory by her husband, Indian poet Jeet Thayil, along other friends and family; the foundation funds and manages the award.

The prize was first awarded in 2008 to Mohammad Hanif for his novel, A Case of Exploding Mangoes.  In 2020, the new Shakti Bhatt Prize was awarded to incarcerated scholars and writers Anand Teltumbde and Gautam Navlakha.

In May 2021, the Foundation announced that there would be no prize for 2021, and instead donated the prize money towards relief efforts relating to the Covid-19 pandemic in India.

Eligibility and Criteria 
Between 2008 and 2019, the Award was open to nominations of first books published during the previous year in the Indian subcontinent within the categories of fiction, non-fiction, poetry, and drama. Eligible books were either written in English, or translated into English from other languages.  Publications from vanity presses were excluded.

In 2020, Thayil announced that the Prize would now be awarded to recognize a writer's body of work, rather than a first book. Speaking about the changes, Thayil stated, "It just seems to us that at this point (in 2020) it does not make sense to have a first book prize. When we started nobody was doing it. In time, first books came up in many shortlists. In fact, there were copycats for just first books prize as well. We just did not see the relevance. So, we wanted to give it to somebody where it will make a difference."

In 2014, the prize amount was increased to ₹200,000.

Awards

References 

First book awards
Indian literary awards